Sam Watford was a  Republican member of the North Carolina General Assembly representing the state's 80th House district, including part in Davidson county (Thomasville). He is currently serving his third term as Davidson County Commissioner and has served on Davidson County Planning and Zoning Board. Watford is married to Karen Hege Watford, a retired teacher, and has two daughters, Morgan and Jordan. Watford supported, and voted for, the HB 465 - Amending Regulations Regarding Abortion, in 2015.

Committee assignments

2021-2022 Session
Energy and Public Utilities (Vice Chair)
State Government Committee (Vice Chair)
Local Government (Co-Chair)
Agriculture
Finance
Health 
Transportation

2017-2018 Session
Appropriations
Appropriations - Transportation
Energy and Public Utilities (Chair)
Regulatory Reform (Vice chair)
Education - Community Colleges
State and Local Government II
Elections and Ethics Law
Homelessness, Foster Care, and Dependency
University Board of Governors Nominating

2015-2016 Session
Appropriations
Appropriations - General Government
Public Utilities (Vice Chair)
Agriculture
Children, Youth and Families
Education - Community Colleges
Local Government

Electoral history

2020

2018

2016

2014

2012

References

External links
Official website

|-

Living people
1950s births
People from Thomasville, North Carolina
Western Carolina University alumni
21st-century American politicians
Republican Party members of the North Carolina House of Representatives